Pipal may refer to:

Ficus religiosa (sacred fig), a species of banyan fig native to India, Bangladesh, Nepal, Pakistan, Sri Lanka, southwest China and Indochina
Pipal, Nepal, a village development committee in Rukum District in the Rapti Zone of western Nepal.
Pipal Park, a park in Omaha, Nebraska, United States
Joseph Pipal, American basketball and football coach